Moses Madywabe is a South African Anglican bishop: he has been the Bishop of Ukhahlamba since 2018.

Notes

21st-century Anglican Church of Southern Africa bishops
Anglican bishops of Ukhahlamba
Living people
Year of birth missing (living people)